Åke Vilhelm Bertil Hallgren (21 August 1918 – 17 June 2005) was a Swedish triple jumper. He competed at the 1948 Summer Olympics and finished in ninth place. He won the national titles in 1940, 1941 and 1945.

References

1918 births
2005 deaths
Swedish male triple jumpers
Olympic athletes of Sweden
Athletes (track and field) at the 1948 Summer Olympics
People from Lidköping Municipality
Sportspeople from Västra Götaland County